Houston Street is a major street in Dallas, Texas. The street marks the east edge of Dealey Plaza.

The street crosses the Trinity River at the Houston Street Viaduct. Completed in 1910, the bridge was the first permanent crossing of the river.

References

Geography of Dallas